Baron Bruno de Leusse de Syon (1916–2009) was a French high-ranking government official, politician and diplomat. He was one of the negotiators of the Évian Accords. He was the French Ambassador to Algeria (1967–68), to Egypt (1972–76) and to the Soviet Union (1976–79). He was the president of the Union des Français de l'Etranger between 1981 and 1997 and the mayor of Nernier from 1987 to 2001.

References

1916 births
2009 deaths
Ambassadors of France to Algeria
Ambassadors of France to Egypt
Ambassadors of France to the Soviet Union
20th-century French diplomats
Mayors of places in Auvergne-Rhône-Alpes
Rally for the Republic politicians